Who's Been Talkin' is the first album by the Robert Cray Band, released in 1980. It received little initial notice due to Tomato Records' bankruptcy. It has been rereleased a couple of times, including under the title Too Many Cooks.

Production
Produced by Bruce Bromberg and Dennis Walker, the album was recorded in two sessions. Cray wrote four of its songs.

Critical reception

Robert Christgau wrote: "Cray can recite his catechism without kowtowing to orthodoxy--guitar like Albert Collins only chillier and more staccato, voice like B.B. King only cleaner and, well, thinner." The New York Times, in a review praising the artistic growth of Cray's Strong Persuader, from 1986, thought that his first three albums "variously recalled the Stax/Volt and Atlantic soul sounds, big-city funk, and bar band rock-and-roll." 

The Globe and Mail commended "the winning confidence, the cool reserve, the sense of pure style and the respectful curiosity about the blues tradition." The Toronto Star thought that "even as a young and impressionable guitarist, Cray had amazing strength and versatility, and no appreciation of his work would be complete without this excellent album."

The Rough Guide to Rock deemed the album "raw and teeming with promise."

Track listing

Personnel
 Robert Cray - Guitar, Vocals
 Richard Cousins - Bass
 Nathaniel Dove - Keyboards
 Buster B. Jones - Drums
 Tom Murphy - Drums
 Dave Olson - Drums
 Curtis Salgado - Harmonica, Vocals
 Nolan Andrew Smith - Trumpet
 David Li - Tenor Saxophone
 Bruce Bromberg - Producer
 Dave Stewart - Producer
 Dennis Walker - Bass, Producer
 Dave Crawford - Engineer
 Bill Dashiell - Engineer

References

Robert Cray albums
1980 debut albums
Tomato Records albums